Holbeach Fen is a fenland settlement and area in the South Holland district of southern Lincolnshire, England.

St John’s chapel of ease was erected in 1840 by Robert Eliot of Fleet on land donated by the Duke of Somerset KG, and by subscription, particularly from Bishop Kaye of Lincoln. Brick built in Early English style it was described by Pevsner in 1964 as consisting of a nave, short chancel, lancet windows, bellcote and shallow porch.

References

External links
 
 Holbeach, Genuki.com. Retrieved 27 October 2011

Villages in Lincolnshire
Holbeach